Rosalyn Terborg-Penn (October 22, 1941 – December 25, 2018) was an American professor of history and author. Terborg-Penn specialized in African-American history and black women's history. Her book African American Women in the Struggle for the Vote, 1850–1920 was a ground-breaking work that recovered the histories of black women in the women's suffrage movement in the United States. She was faculty member of Morgan State University.

Early life and education
Born Rosalyn Marian Terborg in Brooklyn, New York. Her mother Jeanne Terborg (née Van Horn; 1916–2007) was a clerical worker from Indianapolis, and her father Jacques A. Terborg (d. 1997) was a Suriname-born jazz musician. In 1951 her family moved to Queens, where she graduated from John Adams High School in 1959. In 1963 she received a degree in history from Queens College, City University of New York. Terborg-Penn moved to Washington, D.C., earning her master's degree in United States diplomatic history from the George Washington University. Terborg-Penn then obtained her Ph.D. from Howard University in African-American history before 1865.

Early activism
While at Queens College, she was a charter of the college's NAACP chapter. Terborg-Penn headed a protest on campus when the school would not let Malcolm X speak on campus. She also organized student road trips, including a trip to Prince Edward County in Virginia, where schools were closed by anti-racial integration school officials. While there, Terborg-Penn and other students taught black students. Upon moving to Washington, D.C. to attend The George Washington University, she joined the D.C. Students For Civil Rights group and who lobbied for the Civil Rights Act of 1964.

Career

In 1969 Terborg-Penn began teaching at Morgan State University (MSU). She developed the first Ph.D. program at MSU for history students. She also was a faculty member at the University of Maryland, Baltimore and Howard Community College. In 1977 she co-founded the Association of Black Women Historians and served as the organization's first national director.

In 1998, she published African American Women in the Struggle for the Vote, 1850–1920. The work critiqued the received history of the women's suffrage in the United States for having erased the contributions of black women, and identified more than 120 black women that had played roles in the fight for the vote but had been given little recognition. The book argued that as the goals of black activists diverged from their white counterparts over issues of racial oppression, history was written with white women at the center. The work is considered a seminal work in African-American women's history.

Notable works 

Terborg-Penn, Rosalyn and Andrea Benton Rushing. Women in Africa and the African Diaspora: A Reader. Washington: Howard University Press (1997).

References

External links

1941 births
African-American women writers
African-American historians
20th-century American historians
George Washington University alumni
Historians of the United States
Howard University alumni
Queens College, City University of New York alumni
Writers from Brooklyn
Morgan State University faculty
University of Maryland, Baltimore faculty
Activists from New York City
2018 deaths
John Adams High School (Queens) alumni
African-American activists
21st-century American historians
20th-century American women writers
21st-century American women writers
Historians from New York (state)